Lawrence Samuel "Larry" Gains (12 December 1900 – 26 July 1983) was a Black Canadian heavyweight boxer who was champion of Canada and the British Empire. One of the top heavyweights of his era, he was denied the opportunity to become World Champion due to the bar on black boxers competing for the title.

Biography
Gains was born on Sumach Street in the Cabbagetown neighbourhood of Toronto, Ontario, Canada on 12 December 1900. He took up boxing at around the age of twenty, after being asked to act as a sparring partner by Charlie Clay, and boxed out of Toronto's Praestamus Club, an organisation for Black boxers.

Professional career
After a successful amateur career, Gains made the decision to go professional, travelling to Britain on a cattle ship and making his professional début in London as "The Toronto Terror" in June 1923. Many of his early fights were in France (where he befriended Morley Callahan and Ernest Hemingway who at the time were working as newspaper reporters) and Germany, where he beat Max Schmeling in 1925. On Feb.28, 1927 he became Canadian Heavyweight Champion when he stopped Horace "Soldier" Jones in 5 rounds at Toronto. He later defended it against two of the biggest names in Canadian boxing at the time, Jack Renault and Charlie Belanger. He settled in Leicester, England in 1930, where many of his fights over the next few years were held. Noted primarily as a slick boxer he KO'd Phil Scott in front of 30,000 spectators at Leicester Tigers' Welford Road ground in 1931, taking the British Empire title, although the colour bar was still in place. The colour bar was lifted in 1932, and he cemented his hold on the title with a victory over white South African Donald McCorkindale at the Royal Albert Hall, the fight ending in an unpopular points decision for Gains, with Gains' trainer Jack Goodwin collapsing and dying during the fight. Gains was the second black fighter to fight at the Royal Albert Hall, as Len Johnson was the first black fighter due to his contest with Adolf Pott being first. He went on to beat Primo Carnera in front of 70,000 people at White City, London in May that year (a British record attendance for a boxing match), despite Carnera having an advantage of 60 pounds in weight and a four inches in height. He lost the British Empire title in 1934 to Len Harvey, and failed to regain it later that year, defeated by Jack Petersen in front of a crowd of 64,000 at White City.

World coloured heavyweight champion
Gains was considered one of the top heavyweights of his era, but was denied the opportunity to fight for the British Championship and the World Championship due to the rules against black boxers competing for the titles, instead competing for the 'Coloured Heavyweight Championship of the World', a title that he won in 1928 and 1935. His income from boxing dwindled after 1934 and in 1937 he was declared bankrupt. In December 1938 he defeated Welsh champion George James on points. In 1939, with the advent of World War II, Gains joined the British Army as a physical training instructor. He served as a Sergeant Major in the Pioneer Corps in the Middle East. His last fight was a defeat to Jack London in June 1942, held to raise funds for the RAF Benevolent Fund.

Gains retired from boxing at the age of forty. He had 143 professional fights, winning 115 and drawing 5, most of his defeats coming in the latter years of his career. Gains stated that during his career he won around 500,000, much of which was lost through gambling.

Later life

After boxing, Gains had a succession of low-paid jobs. In 1950 he was working as a labourer in Shoeburyness, Essex. In 1953 he was jailed for three months for stealing £222 12/5 from a British Legion club where he worked as a steward. He pleaded guilty and stated that he would repay the money. He successfully appealed against the sentence and was discharged conditionally after a "well known sporting gentleman" repaid the money along with the court costs. Gains went on to be the singer/drummer in a hotel band. In the early 1960s Gains was living on Tooting Broadway and working as a "salvage collection merchant". Gains later worked in car sales and as a boxing trainer in Morden, near London.

With his wife Lisa, he had four children, Betty, Harold, Anne and John. Gains' autobiography, The Impossible Dream, was published in 1976, the title a reference to his dream of becoming World Champion. Max Schmeling contributed a foreword. Gains died in July 1983 from a heart attack while visiting relatives in Cologne, Germany.

Legacy & Honors

In 2020 award-winning author Mark Allen Baker published the first comprehensive account of The World Colored Heavyweight Championship, 1876-1937, with McFarland & Company, a leading independent publisher of academic & nonfiction books. This history traces the advent and demise of the Championship, the stories of the talented professional athletes who won it, and the demarcation of the color line both in and out of the ring.

For decades the World Colored Heavyweight Championship was a useful tool to combat racial oppression-the existence of the title a leverage mechanism, or tool, used as a technique to counter a social element, “drawing the color line.”

In 2015, Gains was posthumously inducted into the Canada's Sports Hall of Fame.

Larry Gains amateur boxing HABC trophy won in March 1922 was restored in 2021 on BBC1 programme "The Repair Shop" by silversmith Brenton West. The trophy was brought in by his granddaughter and great grandson.

Professional boxing record
All information in this section is derived from BoxRec, unless otherwise stated.

Official record

All newspaper decisions are officially regarded as “no decision” bouts and are not counted in the win/loss/draw column.

Unofficial record

Record with the inclusion of newspaper decisions in the win/loss/draw column.

References

External links
Career record at Boxrec.com

|-

1900 births
1983 deaths
Boxers from Toronto
Heavyweight boxers
Black Canadian boxers
World colored heavyweight boxing champions
Canadian expatriate sportspeople in the United States
Canadian male boxers
British Army personnel of World War II
Royal Pioneer Corps soldiers